Loren Fatović (born 16 November 1996) is a Croatian water polo player for VK Jug and the Croatian national team.

He participated at the 2017 World Championships and 2019 World Championships.

Honours
Vk  Jug:

Croatian championship(6): 2015-16,2016-17,2017-18,2018-19,2019-20,2021-22

Croatian Super Cup  2022

Croatian cup(5)  2015-16,2016-17,2017-18,2018-19,2022-23

Len Champions league(1)  2015-16

Len supercup(1)  2016

Regional waterpolo league(3)  2015-16 2016-17 2017-18

See also
 List of world champions in men's water polo
 List of World Aquatics Championships medalists in water polo

References

External links
 

1996 births
Living people
Sportspeople from Dubrovnik
Croatian male water polo players
World Aquatics Championships medalists in water polo
Water polo players at the 2020 Summer Olympics
Olympic water polo players of Croatia